Georges Antoine Chabot (13 April 1758, Montluçon – 18 April 1819, Paris), known as Chabot de Lallier, was a French jurist and statesman.

Biography
Chabot was president of the tribunal in Montluçon, he was elected as a deputy supplant to the National Convention during the French Revolution.

A member of the French Directory's Council of the Ancients, then of the Consulate's Tribunate, he was president of the latter when the Treaty of Amiens recognizing the French Republic was signed. He had a resolution adopted which tended to give Napoleon Bonaparte the consulship for life, and in 1804 supported the proposal to establish a hereditary monarchy (the First French Empire).

Napoleon named him inspector-general of the law schools, then judge of the court of cassation.

He published various legal works, e.g. Tableau de la législation ancienne sur les successions et de la législation nouvelle établie par le code civil (Paris, 1804), and Questions transitoires sur le Code Napoléon (Paris, 1809).

References

External links 
 Questions transitoires sur le Code Napoléon on the Cujas Library website: tome premier; tome second.

People from Montluçon
1758 births
1819 deaths
Deputies to the French National Convention
First French Empire
Members of the Council of Ancients
Members of the Council of Five Hundred
Commandeurs of the Légion d'honneur
French jurists
Court of Cassation (France) judges
Burials at Père Lachaise Cemetery
19th-century French judges
19th-century jurists